D. maculata may refer to:

 Dactyloceras maculata, an African moth
 Dactylorhiza maculata, a perennial plant
 Dellamora maculata, a tumbling flower beetle
 Deltophora maculata, a twirler moth
 Denisonia maculata, an elapid snake
 Dialeurolonga maculata, a true bug
 Dicranota maculata, a hairy-eyed cranefly
 Dictyolathys maculata, an araneomorph spider
 Dieffenbachia maculata, a perennial plant
 Diopatra maculata, a polychaete worm
 Diphtheroglyphus maculata, an invertebrate animal
 Diphucrania maculata, a jewel beetle
 Diploschema maculata, a longhorn beetle
 Diplura maculata, a funnel-web tarantula
 Diuris maculata, an orchid endemic to Australia
 Dolichovespula maculata, a North American wasp
 Dorstenia maculata, a New World herb
 Dorylomorpha maculata, a big-headed fly
 Doto maculata, a sea slug
 Drimiopsis maculata, a perennial herb
 Duvalia maculata, an Old World plant